Thomas Joseph Wickham (born 26 May 1990) is an Australian field hockey player, who plays as a forward.

Personal life
Tom Wickham was born and raised in Morgan, South Australia.

He played representative hockey for his home state South Australia until 2014, when he chose to represent Western Australia at a national level.

Career
He made his international debut in May 2013 during a test series against Korea.

Following his 2013 debut, Wickham did not represent Australia again until his recall into the senior men's squad in 2017. His first appearance in 2017 was during a test series against Pakistan.

Wickham's most notable performance with Australia was at the 2018 Commonwealth Games held in the Gold Coast, Australia, where the Kookaburras won a gold medal.

In 2019, Wickham represented Australia in season one of the FIH Pro League.

He has since represented the team in the FIH Pro League's second season in 2020.

Wickham was selected in the Kookaburras Olympics squad for the Tokyo 2020 Olympics. The team reached the final for the first time since 2004 but couldn't achieve gold, beaten by Belgium in a shootout.

International goals

References

External links
 
 
 

1990 births
Australian male field hockey players
Living people
Commonwealth Games medallists in field hockey
Commonwealth Games gold medallists for Australia
Field hockey players at the 2018 Commonwealth Games
Field hockey players at the 2022 Commonwealth Games
Field hockey players at the 2020 Summer Olympics
Male field hockey forwards
Olympic field hockey players of Australia
Olympic silver medalists for Australia
Medalists at the 2020 Summer Olympics
Olympic medalists in field hockey
20th-century Australian people
21st-century Australian people
Sportsmen from South Australia
2023 Men's FIH Hockey World Cup players
Medallists at the 2018 Commonwealth Games
Medallists at the 2022 Commonwealth Games